is a Japanese animator and director, best known for directing the anime series Haibane Renmei and Hellsing Ultimate.

He has also directed NieA_7, Maria†Holic Alive, and was assistant director on Macross Zero. He has worked on Serial Experiments Lain, Lupin III: $1 Money Wars (Missed by a Dollar), Lupin III: Walther P-38 (Island of Assassins), Armitage III (OVA), White Album, and Space Fantasia 2001 Nights.

External links

Anime directors
Japanese animators
Japanese animated film directors
Living people
Year of birth missing (living people)